Hirtella is a genus of 110 species of woody trees in family Chrysobalanaceae. It was first described as a genus by Linnaeus in 1753. Hirtella naturally occurs in tropical forests throughout Latin America, the West Indies, southeast Africa, and Madagascar. The flowers are mainly pollinated by butterflies.

Species 

List of accepted species according to Kew:

References

 
Chrysobalanaceae genera
Taxonomy articles created by Polbot